Whitey Morgan and the 78's are an American honky tonk country band based in Flint, Michigan. In 2010, they signed a recording contract with Chicago-based Bloodshot Records.

Formation and early history 
Started in 2005, under the name Whitey Morgan and the Waycross Georgia Farmboys, the original members included Whitey Morgan (a.k.a. Eric Allen) on vocals and guitar; Jeremy Mackinder on bass; and Dylan Dunbar and Jack Schneider on guitar and drums respectively. After establishing themselves in the Midwest Honky Tonk scene, the band recorded a self-produced EP which includes early versions of "Goodbye Dixie," "Prove It All To You," and "If It Ain't Broke." The band soon signed a deal with Detroit's own Small Stone Recordings and went back into the studio to record a cover version of Van Halen's "Runnin' with the Devil" for the label's compilation album, Sucking the 70's.

Honky Tonks and Cheap Motels 
In 2007, the band changed its line-up to Whitey Morgan on Vocals and Guitar, Benny James Vermeylen on Guitar and vocals – formerly of 3 Speed and South Normal, Jeremy "Leroy" Biltz on Guitar, Jeremy Mackinder on bass, and Mike Popovich – formerly of The Holy Cows, 3 Speed, and The OffRamps, on drums and officially becomes Whitey Morgan and the 78's. In 2008 the band released its debut album Honky Tonks and Cheap Motels on Small Stone Recordings.

Whitey Morgan and the 78's 
In 2009, the band saw the addition of Tamineh Gueramy on fiddle. The band then headed to Woodstock, New York in the fall of 2009 to begin recording the follow-up to Honky Tonks... at the Levon Helm Studios. With almost 200 shows a year and the new album nearing completion the band drew the attention of Chicago's Bloodshot Records and signed a new record contract. The self-titled album was released on October 12, 2010. Ahead of the record's release, both Benny James and Mike Popovich left the band, replaced by Travis Harrett on the drums and Brett Robinson joined on pedal steel guitar. In April 2012, Jeremy Mackinder was replaced by Joey Spina on guitar. The album Grandpa's Guitar was released in December 2014. It features three cover tunes: Bruce Springsteen's "Highway Patrolman," "Today I Started Loving You Again" by Merle Haggard and Bonnie Owens, and "Dead Flowers" by The Rolling Stones.

Current line-up 
As of August 2018, the line-up features Whitey Morgan on guitar/vocals, Johnny Up on pedal steel guitar, Joey Spina on guitar, Alex Lyon on Bass, Tony Martinez on acoustic guitar and Eric Savage on drums.

National recognition 
After touring with fellow Detroit area band The Deadstring Brothers and Wayne "the Train" Hancock, both Bloodshot Records recording artists, Whitey Morgan and the 78's were signed to Bloodshot in 2010. On October 16, 2010, the band performed on NPR's Mountain Stage. They played a four-song, fifteen-minute set. The episode also featured Scott Miller, Gene Watson and The Steel Drivers.

Discography

Music videos

Awards 
 2009: 3 Detroit Music Awards: Best Country Vocal Performance, Best Country Songwriter, Best Country Album (following the release of their first studio album)
 2010: Best Country Recording (following the release of Whitey Morgan and the 78's)
 2014: Winner of The Ameripolitan Music Awards Outlaw Country Band of the Year

References

External links 
 Whitey Morgan and the 78's

American country music groups
Musical groups from Michigan
Bloodshot Records artists
Country musicians from Michigan
2005 establishments in Michigan